Robert Peter Hanlin (6 October 1931 – 21 August 2000) was an Australian field athlete who competed in the Shot Put in the 1956 Summer Olympics. He won seven consecutive Australian shot put national championship titles.

References

1931 births
2000 deaths
Australian male shot putters
Olympic athletes of Australia
Athletes (track and field) at the 1956 Summer Olympics